Inkeri  is a Finnish female given name and a surname. It is the Finnish equivalent of the given name Ingegerd. Notable people with the name are as follows:

Given name

 Inkeri Anttila (1916–2013), Finnish jurist, criminologist and politician
 Inkeri Lehtinen (1908–1997), Finnish politician

Surname
 Eija Inkeri (1926–2012), Finnish actress

References

Finnish feminine given names
Surnames of Finnish origin
Surnames from given names